This is a list of countries and territories in Europe by population density.

Transcontinental countries
Some of the countries listed below are transcontinental, meaning that they are located in two continents:
 
 The list includes only the European part of Russia, which contains about 75% of the country's total population (110,000,000 people out of about 143,000,000) in an area comprising roughly 3,960,000 square kilometres (1,528,560 sq mi); an average of 30 people per km2 (74/sq mi).
 Only European France is included, not its overseas territories.
 The data for Spain includes islands and exclaves on or near the African continent.
 The data for Portugal includes the Azores and Madeira Islands near the African continent.
 The data for Netherlands includes European Netherlands and the Caribbean Netherlands. It does not include the Caribbean islands Aruba, Curaçao and Sint Maarten as they are constituent countries within the Kingdom of the Netherlands.

Armenia and Cyprus are entirely within Asia physiographically, but have political, cultural and sporting ties to Europe.

There is some discussion about whether Kosovo should be recognised as a separate country. De facto it can be considered as one, but de jure recognition is not clear-cut.

Countries and dependencies

Armenia, Azerbaijan, Cyprus, Georgia and Kazakhstan are either entirely or partially within Asia physiographically, but have historical, political, cultural and sporting ties to Europe.

Notes
Excludes Faroe Islands and Greenland

Partially recognised states

 Except Kosovo and Transnistria, the other three political entities are either entirely or partially within Asia physiographically, but they all have political, cultural and sporting ties to Europe.

See also
 European Union statistics
 List of countries by population density
 List of European countries by area
 List of European countries by population

Notes

References

External links
 European Countries by Population

Europe
Europe
Geography of Europe
Demographics of Europe